Pericles de Oliveira Ramos (born 2 January 1975) is a former Brazilian football player.

Club statistics

References

External links

1975 births
Living people
Brazilian footballers
J1 League players
J2 League players
Japan Football League players
Cerezo Osaka players
Sagan Tosu players
Gainare Tottori players
Brazilian expatriate footballers
Expatriate footballers in Japan
Association football defenders